Arappalayam Bus Terminus is an important mofussil bus terminus in Arappalayam in Madurai in the Indian state of Tamil Nadu.

Overview 
It is the one of the old bus terminus in Madurai city to provide the Moffusil bus service for the following cities like Coimbatore, Tirupur, Dindigul, Theni, Karur, Namakkal, Oddanchatram, Erode, Cumbum, Bodinayakanur, Periyakulam, Pollachi, Ooty, Palani and Salem.

Services 

Being located on the outskirts of Madurai city, the terminus has ten bays to handle more number of mofussil buses. The terminus is utilised by TNSTC, SETC, Kerala State Road Transport Corporation, and Karnataka State Road Transport Corporation.

Amenities 
The facilities available in Arappalayam bus stand includes below.
 Information center and online ticket booking counters for TNSTC, SETC, KSRTC.
 Police outpost 
 Rest room for the crews
 Dispensary health unit
 Flower vending stalls (Licensed) 
 Seating
  plastic Watercans shredding Machine
 Two wheeler Parking for passengers 
 Prepaid taxi, Rental cars, Auto Rickshaws,
 Hotels and Eateries

See also 
 Transport in Madurai
 Tamil Nadu State Transport Corporation
 State Express Transport Corporation (Tamil Nadu)
 Madurai Junction
 Madurai Airport

References 

Bus stations in Madurai